Lawal Shehu (born 15 January 1985) is a Nigerian former professional tennis player.

A native of Kaduna, Shehu competed for the Nigeria Davis Cup team from 2005 to 2016, primarily used as a specialist doubles player. He won two ITF Futures titles in doubles. In 2011 he was a doubles silver medalist at the All-Africa Games in Maputo, partnering Candy Idoko. He was based in France during his career.

ITF Futures finals

Doubles: 4 (2–2)

References

External links
 
 
 

1985 births
Living people
Nigerian male tennis players
Sportspeople from Kaduna
Competitors at the 2011 All-Africa Games
African Games silver medalists for Nigeria
African Games medalists in tennis